= Donald Zak =

American ecologist

- Education: Michigan State University; University of Idaho; Ohio State University
- Scientific career
- Fields: Ecology
- Workplaces: University of Michigan

Donald R. Zak is an American ecologist, currently the Alexander H. Smith Distinguished University Professor of Ecology and Arthur F. Thurnau Professor in the School for Environment and Sustainability (SEAS) at University of Michigan and an Elected Fellow of the American Association for the Advancement of Science and the Ecological Society of America.
